I Haven't Got Anything Better to Do is a studio album by Brazilian bossa nova singer Astrud Gilberto, released on Verve Records in 1969. In the liner notes Gilberto calls the album her "fireplace album".

Reception
The AllMusic review calls the album "an intimate, nocturnal set closer in scope and spirit to the Baroque pop of Burt Bacharach," stating that it is "a minor masterpiece".

Track listing
 "I Haven't Got Anything Better to Do (No Tengo Nada Mejor...)" (Lee Pockriss, Paul Vance) – 2:59
 "Didn't We" (Jimmy Webb) – 2:57
 "Wailing on the Willow" (Harry Nilsson) – 2:16
 "Where's the Love" (Bobby Weinstein, Michel Legrand) – 2:22
 "The Sea Is My Soil (I Remember When)" (Dori Caymmi, Nelson Motta, Peter Udell) – 3:28
 "Trains and Boats and Planes" (Burt Bacharach, Hal David) – 2:50
 "World Stop Turning" (Moose Charlap, Peter Udell) – 2:18
 "Without Him" (Harry Nilsson) – 4:35
 "Wee Small Hours" (Bob Hilliard, David Mann) – 2:18
 "If (The Biggest Little World)" (Garry Sherman, Peter Udell) – 2:34

References

External links
 

1969 albums
Astrud Gilberto albums
Albums produced by Brooks Arthur
Verve Records albums